Loxton may refer to:

Places
 Loxton, Somerset, a village in England
 Loxton, Northern Cape, a town in South Africa
 Loxton, South Australia, a locality in Australia
 Loxton Airport
 Loxton High School
 Loxton railway line, a former railway line
 District Council of Loxton, a former local government area

People
 Bill Loxton (1909–1992), Battle of Britain fighter pilot
 Daniel Loxton (born 1975), editor of Junior Skeptic magazine
 David Loxton (1943–1989), US documentary maker
 Sam Loxton (1921–2011), Australian cricketer, footballer and politician

Other uses
 Loxton House, a heritage-listed former residence in Muswellbrook Shire, New South Wales, Australia